The 1945–46 season was Port Vale's third and final season of football in the wartime league system of World War II. Despite low expectations the club turned a profit in the Third Division (South) North, finishing third in the initial table. They reached the third round of the FA Cup, though ended the season with a disappointing finish in the Third Division (South) North Cup. Overall though the club were in healthy position to resume playing in the Football League the following season.

Overview
The Port Vale management were concerned to learn that they were to compete in the Third Division (South) region for the 1945–46 season, which they felt would result in less revenue and greater expenditure than being in the North division, even though they were still somewhat confusingly placed in the North region of the South Division. They appointed 33-year old former Coventry City half-back Billy Frith as the club's new manager, as predecessor David Pratt was unable to gain release from the Royal Air Force. Again the playing squad was made up mainly of young players and guests, with Scottish inside-right Isaac McDowell being a regular guest. They opened the campaign with three victories from three games, Ralph Gregory proving a revelation on leave from the Royal Marines, scoring a hat-trick in a 4–3 win at Norwich City. However seven games without a victory began with the return fixture with Norwich, before they were boosted by the return of the now demobilised goalkeeper Arthur Jepson. They picked up six of a possible eight points in October and continued their good form right up until the end of the league programme on New Year's Day. They finished in third-place with 24 points in 20 games, eight points behind champions Queens Park Rangers.

The progressed past Wellington Town and Liverpool County Combination amateurs Marine to reach the third round of the FA Cup, which was now being played over two legs. They "put up a grand show" against Bradford (Park Avenue) at Park Avenue, losing 2–1. They then had to settle for a 1–1 draw at home, being denied a penalty and then having a goal ruled out for offside late in the game. A 16 game Third Division (South) North Cup series then began, with the top two teams entering the division's semi-finals. Though they fared poorly, they were fortunate enough to have goalkeeper George Heppell demobilised in time to take the place of an injured Arthur Jepson. Tommy Cheadle made his club debut in a 4–1 home victory over Ipswich Town on 2 March. However this was only one of two victories in the final ten games as Frith experimented with different line-ups in an effort to find a winning combination. They ended the season in eighth-place, picking up 14 points from 16 games. Bill Pointon proved to be a consistent goalscorer, hitting 19 goals in all. The club made a profit of £1,265 on the season, having made a healthy £13,475 in gate receipt money. The City Council agreed to extend the lease on the Old Recreation Ground until June 1950, leaving ample time for Vale Park to be constructed.

Results
Port Vale's score comes first

Legend

Third Division (South) North

League table

Matches

FA Cup

Third Division (South) North Cup

League table

Matches

Player statistics

Appearances

Top scorers

Transfers

Transfers in

Transfers out

References
Specific

General

Port Vale F.C. seasons
Port Vale